The Gettysburg Championship was an annual golf tournament for professional women golfers on the Futures Tour, the LPGA Tour's developmental tour. The event was played from 2006 to 2008 in the Gettysburg, Pennsylvania area.

The tournament was a 54-hole event, as are most Futures Tour tournaments, and included pre-tournament pro-am opportunities, in which local amateur golfers can play with the professional golfers from the Tour as a benefit for local charities.

Winners

* Tournament won in a sudden-death playoff.

Tournament records

External links
Futures Tour official website
The Links at Gettysburg official website

Former Symetra Tour events
Golf in Pennsylvania
2006 establishments in Pennsylvania
2008 disestablishments in Pennsylvania
Recurring sporting events established in 2006
Recurring sporting events disestablished in 2008